Nils Georg Åberg (20 January 1893 – 18 August 1946) was a Swedish athlete who competed at the 1912 Olympics. He won a bronze medal in the long jump and placed second in the triple jump, in which Sweden collected all three medals. He won the long jump event at the Swedish Games in 1916 and at the national championships in 1912, 1913 and 1915. After retiring from competitions he directed his own firm.

References

External links

1893 births
1946 deaths
Swedish male triple jumpers
Swedish male long jumpers
Olympic athletes of Sweden
Athletes (track and field) at the 1912 Summer Olympics
Olympic bronze medalists for Sweden
Olympic silver medalists for Sweden
Medalists at the 1912 Summer Olympics
Olympic silver medalists in athletics (track and field)
Olympic bronze medalists in athletics (track and field)
Sportspeople from Norrköping